Lasmigona compressa, the creek heelsplitter, is a species of freshwater mussel, an aquatic bivalve in the family Unionidae.

This species is found in the northern region of North America. It is native to the Canadian interior basin, and the drainages of the St. Lawrence River and the Ohio River.

References

Molluscs of Canada
Molluscs of the United States
Fauna of the Great Lakes region (North America)
compressa
Bivalves described in 1829
Taxonomy articles created by Polbot